Albeștii de Muscel is a commune in Argeș County, Muntenia, Romania. It is composed of two villages, Albești (the commune centre) and Cândești. It also included Bughea de Sus village, the former commune centre, until 2004, when it was split off to form Bughea de Sus Commune.

The Bratia River has its source in Cândești.

Natives
 Patriarch Iustin of Romania

References

Communes in Argeș County
Localities in Muntenia